Strand was a parliamentary constituency in the Strand district of the City of Westminster.  It returned one Member of Parliament (MP) to the House of Commons of the Parliament of the United Kingdom.

History
The constituency was created by the Redistribution of Seats Act 1885 for the 1885 general election, and abolished for the 1918 general election.

Boundaries
1885–1918: The Strand District (comprising the Liberty of the Rolls, Precinct of the Savoy, St Anne, Soho, St Clement Danes, St Mary le Strand, and St Paul Covent Garden) and the parishes of St James, Westminster, and St Martin in the Fields.

Members of Parliament

Election results

Elections in the 1880s

Smith was appointed Secretary of State for War, requiring a by-election.

Elections in the 1890s
Smith was appointed Lord Warden of the Cinque Ports, requiring a by-election.

Smith's death caused a by-election.

Elections in the 1900s

Elections in the 1910s

General Election 1914–15:

Another General Election was required to take place before the end of 1915. The political parties had been making preparations for an election to take place and by the July 1914, the following candidates had been selected; 
Unionist: Walter Long
Liberal:

References

Parliamentary constituencies in London (historic)
Constituencies of the Parliament of the United Kingdom established in 1885
Constituencies of the Parliament of the United Kingdom disestablished in 1918
City of Westminster